Bengt Fahlström (28 August 1938 – 23 February 2017) was a Swedish journalist and television presenter, he presented Barnjournalen at SVT between 1972 and 1988. In 1979, he was awarded the Stora Journalistpriset for his work with the show.

References

1938 births
2017 deaths
Swedish journalists